The 1974 Idaho Vandals football team represented the University of Idaho in the 1974 NCAA Division I football season. The Vandals were led by first-year head coach Ed Troxel and were members of the Big Sky Conference, then in Division II. They played their home games at new Idaho Stadium, an unlit outdoor facility on campus in Moscow, Idaho.

Troxel was promoted to head coach in December 1973, after seven seasons at Idaho as an assistant under three head coaches, and several years as head coach of the track team. Before his move north to Moscow in 1967, he was very successful at the high school level at Borah  Troxel had previously declined the job in 1970 and days earlier in 1973, but was persuaded to reconsider by player support.

Season

In the Battle of the Palouse, Idaho suffered a seventh straight loss to neighbor Washington State of the Pac-8, falling  at Martin Stadium in Pullman on  In the fourth game with new rival Boise State, the Vandals fell for the third time as the Broncos repeated as conference  Idaho did not schedule Northern Arizona until the following season and both played only five games in conference this year.

This was the last year the Vandals played outdoors on campus; its new Idaho Stadium opened in October 1971 in the same footprint as its predecessor, wooden Neale Stadium  and neither venue had lights. Artificial turf was installed in 1972; the 3M Tartan Turf was the first in the world produced in one continuous piece to allow it to be rolled up on  Following  an arched roof and end walls were constructed in ten months to enclose it and the inaugural indoor game at the renamed Kibbie Dome was played on

Notable players and coaches
Sophomore center John Yarno was a first-team AP All-American as a senior in 1976; he was selected in fourth round of the 1977 NFL Draft and played six seasons with the Seattle Seahawks, the last five as a starter.  Although quarterback Ken Schrom was projected as the starter for 1976 as a redshirt junior, he opted to pursue professional baseball after the 1976 baseball draft. A pitcher, he was a major leaguer for seven seasons and an all-star as a reliever in 1986.

Dennis Erickson, age 27, was in his first year as an offensive coordinator, and stayed for two seasons. He left for Fresno State and later San Jose State, then returned to the UI program in 1982 as head coach and the Vandals began a streak of fifteen consecutive winning seasons.

Division I
Through 1977, the Big Sky was a Division II conference for football, except for Division I member Idaho, which moved down to I-AA in 1978. Idaho maintained its upper division status in the NCAA by playing Division I non-conference opponents (and was ineligible for the Division II postseason).

Schedule

Roster

All-conference
Two Vandals were named to the Big Sky all-conference team: fullback J.C. Chadband and tight end Steve Duncanson.

References

External links
Gem of the Mountains: 1975 University of Idaho yearbook – 1974 football season
Idaho Argonaut – student newspaper – 1974 editions

Idaho
Idaho Vandals football seasons
Idaho Vandals football